Broadstone or Broad Stone may refer to:

 Broadstone, Dublin, an inner city area of Dublin, Ireland
 Broadstone Station, a former railway station and current LUAS station in the Dublin suburb
 Broadstone railway works, a former railway workshop surrounding the station now used as bus garages
 Broadstone, Dorset, a suburb of Poole in Dorset, England
 Broadstone (Dorset) railway station, a disused station in Dorset
Broadstone (ward), a ward in Dorset
 Broadstone (Somerset) railway station, a disused station in Somerset
 Broadstone, Kent 
 Broadstone, Shropshire 	
 Broadstone, Monmouthshire 
 Broadstone, North Ayrshire Site of an old castle and barony
 Broad Stone (County Antrim), or Craigs Dolmen, a megalthic monument and archaeological site in Northern Ireland
 Marion Broadstone (1906–1972), American football player